Dameracherla, alternatively spelled Damaracherla or Damercherla, is a village in Nalgonda district, Telangana, India. It is the head of the mandal of Damaracherla. The local language is Telugu. There are approximately 12,710 people living in the village.

References

Mandal headquarters in Nalgonda district